Indus Public School, Kaithal is a nonprofit day-boarding school in Kaithal, Haryana, India. It operates two campuses, junior and senior wing, in the city.

Description
School was founded by Industrialist and Philanthropist Chaudhary Sri. Mitter Sen Sindhu in 2003 (late) under Sindhu Education Foundation that runs several educational trusts and institutes under Indus Group of Institutions and Param Mitra Manav Nirman Sansthan.
The school is affiliated with Indus public school kaithal (one of the largest institutions providing education at school level in India) and  Central Board of Secondary Education, New Delhi (CBSE). The Senior wing is located at Indus Public School, Dhand Road, Near Suncity, Kaithal. The Junior wing is located at Indus Public School, Sec- 20 Huda, Kaithal.

The school has a faculty of 44 staff. The school has well-equipped laboratories, libraries, computer rooms, classrooms, sports facilities, music room, medical treatment room, and school transport.

See also
 Dr. Ekta Sindhu
 Indus Group of Institutions
 Param Mitra Manav Nirman Sansthan
 Education in India
 Literacy in India  
 List of institutions of higher education in Haryana

References

External links
 www.ipskaithal.edu.in - Official Website

Boarding schools in Haryana
Schools in Haryana
Kaithal
Educational institutions established in 2003
2003 establishments in Haryana